This is a list of franchise records for the St. Louis Blues of the National Hockey League (updated through May 25, 2022).

Career regular season leaders

Skaters

Goaltenders

Single season records

Skaters

Goaltenders

Career playoff leaders

Skaters

Goaltenders

See also
List of St. Louis Blues players
List of St. Louis Blues seasons

References

External links
Hockey-Reference – St. Louis Blues Franchise Index

Records
National Hockey League statistical records